Nan Song may refer to:

Southern Song (1127–1279), the second period of the Song dynasty
Song Nan (born 1990), Chinese figure skater surnamed Song
Nan Song (footballer) (born 1997), Chinese association footballer surnamed Nan